Aijen is a hamlet in the municipality of Bergen in the province of Limburg, the Netherlands.

The village was first mentioned in 1336 as Oyen, and means "land on a stream". Aijen was home to 257 people in 1840.

Aijen does not have a church, but has a chapel from the 16th or 17th century, and it was the religious building in the municipality of Bergen which survived undamaged.

References 

Populated places in Limburg (Netherlands)
Bergen, Limburg